Hofbieber is a municipality in the district of Fulda, in Hesse, Germany.

General
Hofbieber is situated in the center of the Hessian Rhön Mountains near the Mountain Milseburg. The municipality of Hofbieber has approximately 6,500 citizens living within eighteen urban districts and some outlying lonesome farms widespread over 90 km² (34.75 mi²). The main income of the city is farming and tourism from weekend visitors from the Frankfurt Rhine-Main Region.

The urban districts are:
Allmus
Danzwiesen
Elters
Hofbieber
Kleinsassen
Langenberg
Langenbieber
Mahlerts
Mittelberg
Niederbieber
Obergruben
Obernüst
Rödergrund/Egelmes
Schackau
Schwarzbach
Steens
Wiesen
Wittges

Attractions
The picturesque surroundings and a lot of well indicated hiking & biking trails are the credits of these region.

Gallery

References

Municipalities in Hesse
Fulda (district)